Saykhin (Saiqyn) is a village in far western Kazakhstan on the border with Russia. It is the administrative center of Bokey Orda District in West Kazakhstan Region. Population:

Geography
Lake Botkul is located near Saykyn. There is a station of the Volga Railway in the village.

References

Populated places in West Kazakhstan Region